Penny Skateboards is Australian skateboard manufacturing companies founded in 2010 by Ben Mackay in Brisbane.

Products 
The company is most well-known for their creation of the Penny board, a 22" plastic skateboard. Along with the penny board, the company has created other products similar to the penny board such as a larger, 27" variant sometimes referred to as a nickel board. Their 29" model, called the "Surfskate", was created with the intent for the rider to feel as if they are surfing while riding the board. The company also offers a 32" and 36" board which are similar to a typical skateboard and longboard respectively.

See also
List of skateboarding brands

References

External links

Australian companies established in 2010
Sporting goods manufacturers of Australia
Skateboarding companies
Manufacturing companies based in Brisbane